The cast of the television series MythBusters perform experiments to verify or debunk urban legends, old wives' tales, and the like. This is a list of the various myths tested on the show as well as the results of the experiments (the myth is Busted, Plausible, or Confirmed).

Episode overview

Episode 9 – "Explosive Decompression"
 Original air date: January 11, 2004

Explosive Decompression

Frog Giggin'

Rear Axle

Episode 10 – "Chicken Gun"
 Original air date: January 18, 2004

Chicken Gun
Allegedly, British rail companies borrowed the titular gun from NASA for testing windshields for high-speed trains, but were shocked and confused at the amount of carnage the gun did. When they asked NASA what they were doing wrong, they were told to thaw the chickens before firing.

Killer Washing Machine

Octopus Egg Pregnancy

Episode 11 – "Breakstep Bridge"
 Original air date: January 25, 2004

Breakstep Bridge

Rowing Water Skier

Toothbrush Surprise

Episode 12 – "Sinking Titanic"
 Original air date: February 22, 2004

Goldfish Memory
This myth is so widely passed around that it even made it into Time Magazine's "numbers" section at one point.

The Mad Trombonist

This myth was later tested on "Myths Redux"

Sinking Titanic

It was noted during the episode that the story of Charles Joughin, the Titanics chief baker, contradicted the myth. He testified in a 1912 enquiry that he held onto the stern railing of the ship as it went down. As the ship went under, he stepped off; his hair did not get wet, much less himself get sucked under with the ship. However, the story does hold some credence, as many ships emit a large amount of air, as they sink. This massive amount of air, rising to the surface, creates a situation, whereby there is loss of buoyancy, in the air bubbles and anyone caught in this will sink, hence the belief that the ship is 'pulling' a floating person down with it.

Later, while preparing for the Ping Pong Salvage myth, the Sinking Titanic myth was re-tested and re-busted as Adam pointed out.

Episode 13 – "Buried in Concrete"
 Original air date: February 25, 2004

Buried in Concrete
The myth revolved around Jimmy Hoffa, a union leader who unexpectedly disappeared, and the rumors that surrounded his disappearance.  Among the myths was that he was buried under the infamous ten-yard bump in Giants Stadium, a rumor that persisted in various forms of media.

Daddy Long-Legs

Jet Taxi
This was the first myth in which the MythBusters were neither able to confirm nor bust the results due to logistics reasons. According to the episode, upon arrival at Mojave Spaceport, the insurance company responsible for the aircraft backed out at the last minute, citing possible foreign object damage to the plane.  However, BBC's Top Gear was able to independently test and verify this myth.

This myth was re-tested and Confirmed in the Supersized Special.

Additionally, during the Storm Chasing Myths special (2010 season, episode 13), jet engines were used to simulate high wind speeds. Cars were used to demonstrate the power of the winds that both storm chaser's vehicles would be up against. All of the vehicles were shown blowing a considerable distance from the jet engines with significant damage done to both just from the winds alone.

Episode 14 – "Myths Revisited"
 Original air date: June 8, 2004
This was the first episode where the MythBusters retested earlier myths that had been commented or criticized by fans or had not performed as per their original expectations and test spinoff myths related to earlier myths. The episode also introduced Tory Belleci, Scottie Chapman and Christine Chamberlain and became the first episode to extensively feature Build Team members or Mythterns.  This is also the first episode to officially use the Busted/Plausible/Confirmed system; previous episodes were a bit looser and only had Busted as a consistent verdict.

Breakstep Bridge
This myth was retested for the episode but ultimately did not air in the US version—although the Robin Banks–narrated Discovery Europe version did include it. This myth is also included in the DVD version of MythBusters Outtakes.

Chicken Gun

Ice Bullet

Cell Phone Destruction

Aerosol Bazooka

Exploding Implants

Peeing on the Third Rail

Goldfinger

Episode 15 – "Scuba Diver and Car Capers"
 Original air date:  July 27, 2004

Forest Fire Scuba Diver

Car Capers

Episode 16 – "Ancient Death Ray"
 Original air date: September 29, 2004

Ancient Death Ray
The MythBusters take on a myth from antiquity, where it is claimed that Archimedes constructed a solar-powered weapon by reflecting sunlight onto Roman ships.  The result of the test sparked so much controversy, especially in engineering circles, that an entire episode ("Archimedes' Death Ray") was dedicated to a 2006 retest. In 2010, the myth was revisited again in the "President's Challenge" episode, in which United States President Barack Obama challenged Adam and Jamie to make a third attempt using more manpower. To date, this and JATO Rocket Car are the only myths to have been tested three times on the show.

Skunked!
The smell of skunk musk can be removed with...

What is Bulletproof?
Adam and Jamie test whether some things that are mythically held to be bulletproof are actually bulletproof – included among them was an assertion by Jamie in the first season on their Lexan barriers being bulletproof.

Bullets can be stopped by...

Episode 17 – "Elevator of Death, Levitation Machine"
 Original air date: October 6, 2004

Elevator of Death
This myth is fueled by the story of an elevator attendant found alive but badly injured in an elevator car that had fallen 75 stories down a shaft in the Empire State Building after a B-25 Mitchell bomber crashed into it in 1945.

After finding a bowling ball in the abandoned hotel in which they were testing the myth, Kari decided to test out a "mini-myth" of her own.

Levitation Machine
Adam and Jamie try to build a hovercraft from vacuum cleaner parts, and after finding it plausible, decide to compete against each other in a homemade hovercraft racing contest.  Adam, along with Tory and Christine (dubbed 'Team Savage'), built the heavier Lillypad Flyer, while Jamie, Scottie, and Kari (dubbed 'Hyneman's Heroes') worked together to make the Hyneman Hoverboard.

Episode 18 – "Beat the Radar Detector"
 Original air date: October 13, 2004

Plywood Builder
Adam and Jamie tested a construction-related myth, and put several other objects said to be able to act as a parachute to the test.

Beat the Radar Gun
This is the first myth entirely tested by the Build Team.

It is possible to legally beat the police speed radar and/or lidar by...

Episode 19 – "Quicksand"
 Original air date: October 20, 2004

Killer Quicksand

Appliances in the Bath

Exploding Tattoo

Episode 20 – "Exploding Jawbreaker"
 Original air date: October 27, 2004

Exploding Jawbreaker
Inspired by incidents that left two children - Cameron DeHall and Taquandra Diggs - with what were later diagnosed as chemical burns after Jawbreakers blew up in their faces. It had also been reported that DeHall had heated his Jawbreaker in the microwave. The Diggs family and several other victims' families had already sued Nestlé for medical bills resulting from plastic surgery as well as pain and suffering. The lawsuits were later settled outside of court for an undisclosed amount.

Adam and Jamie, with help from Tory and Christine, tested the myth in a number of ways. When Jamie cut a Jawbreaker open using a band saw, he found that the way the candy is built (various layers of sugar around a solid candy center) creates the potential for a temperature differential. Specifically, the various layers can heat at different rates, creating a scenario where a layer can expand, cause pressure on the outer shell and make the candy unstable. (Christine found, by using an infrared thermometer, that one layer got up to 107 degrees Celsius  after microwave heating.) If the candy was compressed - including in someone's jaws - the candy could explosively burst and its almost molten centers could cause painful burns.

As a finale, Jamie created a more literal exploding Jawbreaker by removing the core, filling it with gunpowder, adding a fuse and then detonating it.

Static Cannon

Killer Deck

Episode 21 – "Pingpong Rescue"
 Original air date: November 3, 2004

Ping Pong Salvage
Adam and Jamie explore the possibility of raising a ship with ping-pong balls, originally conceived in the 1949 Donald Duck story The Sunken Yacht by Carl Barks.

Carried Away
The Build Team takes on a gag used in many comedic works, where a baby or small child is lifted into the air and flies away unintentionally when given helium balloons.

See also Larry's Lawn Chair Balloon from Pilot 3.

Episode 22 – "Boom-Lift Catapult"
 Original air date: November 10, 2004

Boom-Lift Catapult

AC vs. Windows Down
Adam and Jamie tackle not so much a myth as what they call an "urban puzzle". The debate arises because both methods of cooling influence a car's fuel efficiency—air conditioning requires a lot of power to run, but at the same time, open windows create drag. This myth was revisited in "MythBusters Revisited".

Episode 23 – "Exploding House"
 Original air date: November 16, 2004

Bug Bomb

Talking to Plants

Needle in a Haystack
Adam and Jamie competed against each other in a contest to bust an old adage. While Jamie teamed up with Christine and Scottie in a machine known as Earth, Wind & Fire which burned the hay to leave the needles behind, Adam, Kari, and Tory used the Needlefinder 2000, a machine that relied on water to separate needles from the hay (in the theory that needles would sink in water while hay floated). Each team had to locate four needles among ten bales of hay—three of steel of varying sizes and one of bone. Adam's team won the contest, in great part because his team's machine "processed" their haystack more quickly.

Episode 24 – "Ming Dynasty Astronaut"
 Original air date: December 5, 2004

Ming Dynasty Astronaut
The MythBusters take on a story, taken from the 1945 book Rockets and Jets by Herbert Zim, describes a Ming dynasty astrologer named Wan Hu and determine whether he really was the first astronaut in space as a result.

Free Energy
By far the most popular of the submitted myths are those regarding perpetual motion – it was claimed in an interview by Adam that there was enough material to create three seasons of busting potential free energy machines. One test (different from the included radio device), cut for time and shown on "MythBusters Outtakes" involves coils of baling wire being used to siphon off electricity from nearby PG&E power lines in the Santa Cruz Mountains. Adam, Jamie and MIT electrical engineer Dr. Geo Homsy tested whether real free energy can be obtained using the following, which tended to involve more well-known ideas:

Killer Ceiling Fan
The myth of decapitation by jumping into a ceiling fan has two versions, both of which were tested: jumping up into the blades from below (via a kid jumping up and down on a bed) and jumping forward so as to carry the neck into the blades from the side (the so-called "lover's leap".) To test this, Kari and Scottie bought a regular house fan and also an industrial fan (with a higher top speed and metal blades as opposed to wood), and then they and Tori encased pig spines and latex arteries filled with fake blood inside busts of Adam and added human craniums. They then added rigs for both scenarios.

Episode SP1 – "Viewers-Choice/Christmas Special"
 Original air date: December 22, 2004

In this episode, Adam and Jamie test holiday-related myths while revealing the top-10 myths as voted upon by fans of the series. Clips were shown from each of these segments, in reverse order from #10 to #1.

 Tree Cannon Jet Assisted Chevy Escape From Alcatraz Stinky Car Barrel of Bricks Larry's Lawn Chair Balloon Pop Rocks and Soda Beat the Breath Test Chicken Gun (clips from both the original test and the revisit are shown)
 CD-ROM Shattering''Holiday Myths:'

Mini Myth – "Busting the Egguinox Myth"

Egg-uinox
The Egg-uinox myth was perhaps too short to air in any episode, as it was easily and conclusively busted.

References

External links

 MythBusters Official site
 

2004 American television seasons
2004